Frank Dayish Jr. (born 1958) is an American politician, who was the 6th Vice President of the Navajo Nation under President Joe Shirley, Jr.

References

External links

1958 births
Living people
Vice Presidents of the Navajo Nation
20th-century Native Americans
21st-century Native Americans